The Walker A and Walker B motifs are protein sequence motifs, known to have highly conserved three-dimensional structures. These were first reported in ATP-binding proteins by Walker and co-workers in 1982.

Of the two motifs, the A motif is the main "P-loop" responsible for binding phosphate, while the B motif is a much less conserved downstream region. The P-loop is best known for its presence in ATP- and GTP-binding proteins, and is also found in a variety of proteins with phosphorylated substrates. Major lineages include:
 RecA and rotor ATP synthase / ATPases (α and β subunits).
 Nucleic acid-dependent ATPases: helicases, Swi2, and PhoH
 AAA proteins
 STAND NTPases including MJ, PH, AP, and NACHT ATPases
 ABC-PilT ATPases
 Nucleotide kinases
 G domain proteins: G-proteins (transducin), myosin.

Walker A motif

Walker A motif, also known as the Walker loop, or P-loop, or phosphate-binding loop, is a motif in proteins that is associated with phosphate binding. The motif has the pattern G-x(4)-GK-[TS], where G, K, T and S denote glycine, lysine, threonine and serine residues respectively, and x denotes any amino acid. It is present in many ATP or GTP utilizing proteins; it is the β phosphate of the nucleotide that is bound. The lysine (K) residue in the Walker A motif, together with the main chain NH atoms, are crucial for nucleotide-binding. It is a glycine-rich loop preceded by a beta strand and followed by an alpha helix; these features are typically part of an α/β domain with four strands sandwiched between two helices on each side. The phosphate groups of the nucleotide are also coordinated to a divalent cation such as a magnesium, calcium, or manganese(II) ion.

Apart from the conserved lysine, a feature of the P-loop used in phosphate binding is a compound LRLR  nest comprising the four residues xxGK, as above, whose main chain atoms form a phosphate-sized concavity with the NH groups pointing inwards. The synthetic hexapeptide SGAGKT has been shown  to bind inorganic phosphate strongly; since such a short peptide does not form an alpha helix, this suggests that it is the nest, rather than being at the N-terminus of a helix, that is the main phosphate binding feature.

Upon nucleotide hydrolysis the loop does not significantly change the protein conformation, but stays bound to the remaining phosphate groups.  Walker motif A-binding has been shown to cause structural changes in the bound nucleotide, along the line of the induced fit model of enzyme binding.

Similar folds 

PTPs (protein tyrosine phosphatases) that catalyse the hydrolysis of an inorganic phosphate from a phosphotyrosine residue (the reverse of a tyrosine kinase reaction) contain a motif which folds into a P-loop-like structure with an arginine in the place of the conserved lysine. The conserved sequence of this motif is C-x(5)-R-[ST], where C and R denote cysteine and arginine residues respectively.

Pyridoxal phosphate (PLP) utilizing enzymes such as cysteine synthase have also been said to resemble a P-loop.

A-loop

The A-loop (aromatic residue interacting with the adenine ring of ATP) refers to conserved aromatic amino acids, essential for ATP-binding, found in about 25 amino acids upstream of the Walker A motif in a subset of P-loop proteins.

Walker B motif

Walker B motif is a motif in most P-loop proteins situated well downstream of the A-motif. The consensus sequence of this motif was reported to be [RK]-x(3)-G-x(3)-LhhhD, where R, K, G, L and D denote arginine, lysine, glycine, leucine and aspartic acid residues respectively, x represents any of the 20 standard amino acids and h denotes a hydrophobic amino acid. This motif was changed to be hhhhDE, where E denotes a glutamate residue. The aspartate and glutamate also form a part of the DEAD/DEAH motifs found in helicases. The aspartate residue co-ordinates magnesium ions, and the glutamate is essential for ATP hydrolysis.
There is considerable variability in the sequence of this motif, with the only invariant features being a negatively charged residue following a stretch of bulky, hydrophobic amino acids.

See also 
 Activation loop
 Autophosphorylation
 Ca2+/calmodulin-dependent protein kinase
 Cell signaling
 Cyclin-dependent kinase
 G protein-coupled receptor
 Nucleoside-diphosphate kinase
 Phosphatase
 Phosphatidylinositol phosphate kinases
 Phospholipid
 Phosphoprotein
 Phosphorylation
 Phosphotransferase
 Signal transduction
 Thymidine kinase
 Thymidine kinase in clinical chemistry
 Thymidylate kinase
 Wall-associated kinase

References

External links 
 Prosite entry for Walker A motif, PS00017
 Prosite entry for DEAD box motif PS51195

Protein structural motifs